Çeltek is a village in the district of Vezirköprü, Samsun Province, Turkey.

References

Villages in Vezirköprü District